Ozoliņš (Old orthography: O(h)solin(g); feminine: Ozoliņa) is a Latvian surname, derived from the Latvian word for "oak" (ozols). Individuals with the surname include:

Alberts Ozoliņš (1896–1985), Latvian weightlifter
 Kārlis Ozoliņš (1905—1987), Latvian Soviet politician and journalist
 Kārlis Ozoliņš (born 1994), Latvian ice hockey player
 Kārlis Ozoliņš (born 2002), Latvian tennis player
Sandis Ozoliņš (born 1972), Latvian ice hockey player
Valdemārs Ozoliņš (1896–1973), Latvian composer and conductor

See also 
Ozolin
Ozols

References

Latvian-language masculine surnames